Razali Rashid is a Singaporean football forward who played for Singapore in the 1984 Asian Cup. He also played for Farrer Park United. He played for Kelantan and Sarawak

References
Stats

Singaporean footballers
Singapore international footballers
Living people
1984 AFC Asian Cup players
Southeast Asian Games silver medalists for Singapore
Southeast Asian Games medalists in football
Association football forwards
Year of birth missing (living people)
Competitors at the 1983 Southeast Asian Games